The orangefin labeo (Labeo calbasu) is a fish of the carp family Cyprinidae, found commonly in rivers and freshwater lakes in and around South Asia and South-East Asia. Native to Bangladesh and India.

References 

 

Labeo
Fish described in 1822